Indonesia competed for the first time in the Southeast Asian Games in 1977 in Kuala Lumpur, Malaysia. Indonesia ranks 2nd on the current All-time Medal Tally behind the powerhouse Thailand. Indonesia has dominated the medal tally ranks, excluding all of the games that Indonesia has hosted, they have ranked 1st in 1977, 1981, 1983, 1989, 1991, and 1993.

Indonesia has hosted the games 4 times, first in 1979, again in 1987, 10 years later in 1997, and their final hosted event in 2011.

History
Indonesia has hosted the games 4 times. They first competed in 1977 debuting with the Philippines and Brunei. Indonesia bid and hosted the 1979 Southeast Asian Games in Jakarta, Indonesia. They hosted again after 9 years in 1987, they hosted again after 10 years in 1997, and hosted their recent games in 2011 after 14 years in Jakarta and Palembang. Indonesia then hosted the 2018 Asian Games after 7 years of hosting the Southeast Asian Games. Indonesia hosted the Asian Games once before in 1962 in Jakarta.

Medal Tally 
*Red border color indicates tournament was held on home soil.

References